Thomas Greanias (born February 19, 1965 in Wilmette, Illinois) is an American novelist known for his series of novels focusing on Conrad Yeats and Atlantis.

Conrad Yeats series
The series focuses on Conrad Yeats, an archeologist tasked with discovering the origins of the human race as well as saving it from the end of the world. He is accompanied by Serena Serghetti, a brilliant linguist from the Vatican.  The first novel, Raising Atlantis, was initially published through Greanias's website and was given an ebook release in 2005. Later that same year it was given a paperback release through Pocket Star.

Greanias put out two additional novels in the series, The Atlantis Prophecy (2008) and The Atlantis Revelation (2009), but has stated that it was initially intended to be made up of seven. The third book in the series, The Atlantis Prophecy, placed on the New York Times' Bestseller List for mass market paperbacks for the week of May 4, 2008. Greanias continued writing about the character of Conrad Yeats with the 2007 publication of The Virgin City, set prior to the events of Raising Atlantis. This marked the first entry in The Virgin Mysteries series. He put out a second entry in the series, the short story The Virgin Sky, which is set chronologically between Raising Atlantis and The Atlantis Prophecy. He has also published another short story set in the series, The Virgin Sea, which follows the character of Serena Serghetti.

In 2007 Greanias published a prequel, The Virgin City, and in 2013 he returned to the character for The Alignment series, which ties in with the ARG mobile game Ingress.

Bibliography

Conrad Yeats 

 Raising Atlantis (2005)
 The Atlantis Prophecy (2008)
 The Atlantis Revelation (2009)

The Virgin Mysteries 
The Virgin City: The First Conrad Yeats Adventure (2007)
The Virgin Sky: The Secret History of America's Capital (2020 - Kindle publication)
The Virgin Sea

Dominus Dei 

The Chiron Confession (2012)
Wrath of Rome (2012)
Rule of God (2012)

Sam Decker 

The Promised War (2010)
The 34th Degree (2011)

The Alignment 
The Alignment: Ingress (2013)
The Alignment: Federal City (2014)

Standalone novels 

 The War Cloud (2010)
 Red Glare (2020)

References

External links

 
 

1965 births
Living people
21st-century American novelists
People from Wilmette, Illinois
Novelists from Illinois